Tanzila Khan is a Pakistani disability rights activist, author, motivational speaker, and founder of Girly Things PK, a mobile application which delivers sanitary napkins to women with disabilities. Khan focuses on raising awareness of and access to reproductive health and education, especially for those with disabilities. She has written several books on the subject as well as given public speeches and seminars. She also works to de-stigmatise disabilities in Pakistan.

Early life 
Khan has been reliant on a wheelchair since birth. In her youth, she was involved with theater, directing a production of The Addams Family Rendezvous. She later worked for global change-makers youth camp and a Youth Activism Summit, designing several workshops for the latter.

Khan would later revisit the medium of theatre in "Theatre of the Taboo", a training module for sexual and reproductive health and rights and related issues. Khan holds a Bachelor of Laws degree in International Development from the University of London.

Girly Things 
Due to the endemic menstrual taboo, support for feminine hygiene products is inadequate in Pakistan. In response, Khan founded the startup company Girly Things PK to make them more accessible for women in Pakistan, delivering sanitary napkins to women at home and in emergency situations, in the manner of a food delivery service. The urgent kits include "a disposable undergarment, three pads and a blood stain remover", the latter being an original Girly Things product.

Khan recounts a personal experience of her period starting while she was running errands. She found herself in urgent need, but the shops were not accessible to wheelchair users such as herself. The company aims to expand to offering contraceptives. The company also offers products that some women may be uncomfortable purchasing openly in shops, including toilet seat covers and hair removal creams, and is investigating means for sanitary disposal of used pads.

Works 
Khan published her first book at just 16, using the proceeds to fund community projects in her area. She has written the following works:
 A Story of Mexico
 The Perfect Situation: Sweet Sixteen

Awards 
Khan has won the following awards for her activism:
Young Connector of the Future (Swedish Institute)
Young Leader (Women Deliver)
Khadija tul Kubra Award (national level recognition for advocacy)
Youth Champion at Rise Up (Packard Foundation)
Six-two 35 Under 35 Changemaker of 2018
Received funding from AmplifyChange to establish a Training Institute in Lahore on SRHR and disabilities
Invited to speak at TEDxKinnaird in 2012

References 

Pakistani disability rights activists
21st-century Pakistani businesspeople
21st-century Pakistani women
1986 births
Living people
Pakistani women in business
Pakistani women activists
21st-century Pakistani women writers
21st-century Pakistani writers
Alumni of the University of London